Perayam may refer to:
 Perayam, Kollam, village in Kollam district, near Kundara, Kerala, India. NSS Arts & Science College situated at Perayam. The NH183 passes through Perayam area.
 Perayam, Thiruvananthapuram, village in Thiruvananthapuram district, Kerala, India